Attorney General Hogg may refer to:

David P. Hogue (1815–1871), Attorney General of Florida
Douglas Hogg, 1st Viscount Hailsham (1872–1950), Attorney General for England and Wales
Jim Hogg (1851–1906), Attorney General of Texas

See also
General Hogg (disambiguation)